Baldassare Porto (19 January 1923 – 30 November 2013) was an Italian sprinter who competed in the men's 4 × 400 m event at the 1952 Summer Olympics in Helsinki. In 1950 he also became a national champion in the 400m discipline.

References

External links

Baldassare Porto's obituary 

1923 births
2013 deaths
Italian male sprinters
Olympic athletes of Italy
Athletes (track and field) at the 1952 Summer Olympics
Mediterranean Games silver medalists for Italy
Mediterranean Games medalists in athletics
Athletes (track and field) at the 1955 Mediterranean Games
Italian Athletics Championships winners